Jean Clark may refer to:
 Jean Clark (cricketer)
 Jean Clark (artist)